Eplivanserin (SR-46,349; planned trade name Ciltyri) was an experimental drug for the treatment of insomnia which was being developed by Sanofi Aventis.

Sanofi Aventis announced in December 2009 that it was withdrawing its application for approval of eplivanserin from both the U.S. Food and Drug Administration and the European Medicines Agency.

Mechanism of action 

Eplivanserin is an inverse agonist on the serotonin receptor subtype 5-HT2A. In contrast to older sedating drugs acting on 5-HT2A receptors (e.g., mirtazapine, clozapine, risperidone), eplivanserin has practically no affinity to dopamine, histamine and adrenergic receptors.

Study results 

In a placebo controlled Phase II clinical trial with 351 subjects, eplivanserin reduced the sleep latency by 39 minutes (versus 26 minutes under placebo).

Synthesis

The condensation between 2'-Fluoroacetophenone [445-27-2] (5) & 4-hydroxybenzaldehyde [123-08-0] (6) give a chalcone intermediate (also an enone), i.e. CID:53982926 (7). 

(2-chloroethyl)dimethylamine (CDMA) & acetone oxime are reacted together to give dimethylaminoacetoxime (DMA acetoxime), CID:16641114 (3). 

Convergent synthesis gives the product as a mixture of isomers.

See also 
 Pimavanserin
 Volinanserin

References 

Hypnotics
Phenols
Fluoroarenes
Ketoximes
Dimethylamino compounds